"Someday Somewhere" is a song by Greek singer Demis Roussos. It was released as a single in 1973.

The song was included on Roussos' 1974 album My Only Fascination.

Background and writing 
The song was written by Alec R. Costandinos and Stélios Vlavianós. The recording was produced by Demis Roussos.

Commercial performance 
The song reached no. 1 in Belgium (Flanders) and Spain.

Track listing 
7" single Philips 6009 420 (1973, France, Italy, etc.)
7" Single RTB / Philips S 53741 (1974, Yugoslavia)
 A. "Someday Somewhere" (3:00)
 B. "Lost in a Dream" (4:12)

7" single Philips 6009 416 (1973, Netherlands)
 A. "Someday Somewhere" (3:06)
 B. "My Friend the Wind" (3:54)

Charts

Weekly charts

Year-end charts

References 

1973 songs
1973 singles
Demis Roussos songs
Philips Records singles
Number-one singles in Spain
Ultratop 50 Singles (Flanders) number-one singles
Songs written by Alec R. Costandinos
Song recordings produced by Demis Roussos
Songs written by Stélios Vlavianós